Excalibur: Morgana's Revenge is a first-person shooter video game developed by ExcaliburWorld Software. The game's development has been closely tied to the Marathon and later Aleph One engines, on which it is based. Most recently, the game was expanded and re-released in 2007 for OS X, Microsoft Windows, and Linux using the open-source Aleph One engine.

The game's story expands on the legend of King Arthur and involves the Sword of Power, Excalibur; the wizard Merlin; the sorceress Morgana; and the future United Earth Federation (UEF). The story takes places across three time periods. According to the game, Morgana uses the Charm of Making to imprison Merlin in ice during the fall of Arthur's kingdom. Merlin then disappears from Camelot in an electrical storm during the battle for Camelot.

Synopsis

Plot 
The electrical storm represents a break in the space-time continuum, and Merlin is hurled into the future. At first introduced to the Federation as an unusual artificial intelligence of unknown origins, Merlin becomes part of the UEF computer system on the Starship Kronos. Merlin helps the Federation Marines in the space pirate raids of 2289. One of the Marines is the game's protagonist and player character, who becomes a hero fighting against the pirate Starship Diablo in a battle known as "Devil in a Blue Dress" prior to the events of the game.

Following this battle, the Marine takes rest on the Starship Kronos, where he learns the secret of Merlin. Merlin explains that Morgana is behind the pirate raids, and has learned how to travel through time. Using unstable time travel technology developed on Kronos, the Marine sets forth on an epic journey to thwart Morgana's diabolical plot to control mankind's destiny. During his quest the Marine searches for Actinium crystals in the untamed, raptor-infested jungles of the Jurassic, frees Quest Knights and hunts down Mordred in the castle arenas of Camelot, and has a final showdown with Morgana and her evil minions in the war-torn streets of the future.

Charm of Making 

The game borrows story elements from the 1981 John Boorman film Excalibur, including Merlin's Charm of Making. In EMR, the Charm of Making is a special incantation spell which Morgana stole from Merlin. Morgana uses the spell to freeze Merlin during the Arthurian period, and to control many of her forces during the Camelot, Jurassic, and Future time periods. The hero eventually discovers the spell during the final battle with Morgana.

Development

Beginnings
In 1994, Bungie released Marathon. The game's dark corridors, eerie background music, stairs & platforms, strange aliens, and story told through terminal interfaces created a unique experience on the Mac.

The introduction of Pfhorte, a Marathon map editor, allowed Marathon players to become map makers. The Marathon Map Makers Guild formed as an internet-based place for map makers to help meet the challenges of map editing. Previously, MMMG member Greg Ewing had written WolfEdit, a program for creating custom levels in Wolfenstein 3D for the Mac.

The MMMG mailing list was active with daily questions, answers and ideas. MMMG member Craig Durkin's idea of a group project eventually led to Devil in a Blue Dress, a Marathon scenario which was a collaborative group effort, spearheaded by Claude Errera.

Demo & EMR 1.0
Encouraged by positive feedback for Devil in a Blue Dress, some members of the MMMG decided to start a new project that would incorporate new textures, sprites, sounds, weapons, and other customizable assets. This project began in November 1995, and 10 months later the first demo for Excalibur: Morgana's Revenge (EMR) was released to the public.

While work continued on EMR, Bungie released Marathon 2: Durandal. This sequel incorporated new features such as ambient sounds and liquid media. Claude Errera directed the porting of Devil in a Blue Dress (DiaBD) to the Marathon 2 engine to take advantage of these features. Meanwhile, Bill Catambay continued with the EMR project using the original Marathon engine.

Neither developer considered their project easy or trivial, with contributors coming and going making their completions questionable. DiaBD 2.0 was completed first, and was a bigger success than the original DiaBD. Meanwhile, progress on EMR was delayed due to the amount of physics, sounds, graphics and music work needed. However, the MMMG persisted. New contributors made significant contributions during the final months of development, including Jim Bisset's original music, Candace Sheriff's Archer and Cavebob sprites, Chilton Webb's dinosaurs, and Jeremy Dale's player sprite. In June 1997, EMR v1.0 was released to the public.

EMR 2.0
In 1996 Bungie released Marathon Infinity, which offered new features and capabilities, as well as the tools Forge and Anvil for editing maps, physics, shapes and sounds. Members of the MMMG imagined what EMR could become with the new features, and less than a month later Bill Catambay began leading work on porting EMR to Infinity.

The Infinity port was comparatively complex and required substantial work. It included new levels, graphics, physics models, sounds, music, images, story, and terminal graphics. Existing graphics and levels were enhanced, and the game saw increased fine tuning and beta testing. In April 2000, EMR 2.0 was released using Marathon Infinity'''s engine, containing over 50 levels.

EMR 3.0
Just prior to its acquisition by Microsoft in 2000, Bungie released the source code to the Marathon 2 engine and the Marathon Open-source project began, resulting in the new engine called Aleph One. In 2004, Glen Ditchfield approached Bill Catambay to convince him that Aleph One was by then stable enough to port EMR. Aleph One developer Loren Petrich wrote initial script for EMR in MML, the Marathon Markup Language. Catambay estimated the port to be another 3-year project, in order to take advantage of new features in Aleph One like MML and Lua scripting support. In autumn of 2004, work began on EMR 3.0.

While previous iterations of EMR had over 40 contributors around the world, no more than 15 people worked on the Aleph One port. A lot of work from past contributors was re-used. The new rendition of EMR featured high resolution textures, 16-bit sound, revamped and new music, edited and expanded maps, and MML & lua scripting. In May 2007, EMR 3.0 was released to the public. For the first time, EMR'' 3.0 required no installer, and due to Aleph One's cross-platform compatibility was playable on Windows, Linux, and Macs with PPC and Intel processors. In 2015 the game was ported to the OpenPandora, an ARM processor based handheld.

EMR Music
Most of the music in EMR is original music, the bulk of which is compiled by James Bisset, with some original pieces by Bill Catambay and Dane Smith. The soundtrack to EMR 3.0 can be found on iTunes, Amazon.com, Google Play, and Game OST.

Reviews 
EMR 3.0 was reviewed on several game magazine websites. While not all game reviews are still available, a review by Chris Barylick can still be found on the Mac Observer website. As Chris wrote: "This is a work of love, complete with the style, humor and overall feel the Bungie games were renowned for". The game was downloaded alone via SourceForge 220,000 times.

References

External links
 (archived)
EMR Story Page
EMR SourceForge Project
Download EMR

1997 video games
Action-adventure games
Linux games
MacOS games
Marathon engine games
Open-source video games
Science fiction video games
Sprite-based first-person shooters
Video games based on Arthurian legend
Video games developed in the United States
Video games with 2.5D graphics
Windows games